Sioux Ghost Dance is an 1894 black-and-white silent film from Edison Studios, produced by William K. L. Dickson with William Heise as cinematographer. Filmed on a single reel, using standard 35 mm gauge, it has a 21-second runtime. The film was shot in Edison's Black Maria studio at the same time as Buffalo Dance. These are two of the earliest films made which feature Native Americans. In this film, a group of Sioux warriors, including two boys, perform the Ghost Dance. According to the Edison catalog, the performers in both films were genuine Sioux people wearing traditional costumes and war paint. All were veterans of Buffalo Bill's Wild West show.

See also
 List of Western films before 1920

References

External links 
 
 

1894 films
1894 Western (genre) films
1890s dance films
1894 short films
American black-and-white films
American dance films
American short documentary films
American silent short films
Black-and-white documentary films
Films about Native Americans
Films directed by William Kennedy Dickson
Films shot in New Jersey
Silent American Western (genre) films
Sioux
1890s American films